|}

This is a list of Legislative Council results for the Victorian 1985 state election. 22 of the 44 seats were contested.

Results by province

Ballarat

Boronia

Central Highlands

Chelsea

Doutta Galla

East Yarra

Eumemmerring

Geelong

Gippsland

Higinbotham

Jika Jika

Melbourne

Melbourne North

Melbourne West

Monash

North Eastern

North Western

Nunawading 

Includes the casting vote by the returning officer.
This result was overturned by the Court of Disputed Returns and a by-election was held.

South Eastern

Templestowe

Waverley

Western

See also 

 1985 Victorian state election
 Members of the Victorian Legislative Council, 1985–1988

References 

Results of Victorian state elections